Richard Frinier (born 1946 in Los Angeles, California) is an American furniture, textile and industrial designer who lives and works in California.

A graduate of California State University Long Beach holding a master of arts degree, Frinier has been a product designer in the home industries since 1977, with emphasis on indoor/outdoor furniture, textiles and accessories. He has worked for and collaborated with manufacturers domestically and abroad, including Glen Raven/Sunbrella® textiles, Dedon, Brown Jordan, Century Furniture and others. His range of work encompasses hundreds of collections and thousands of individual product designs. In 2002, he co-founded the Richard Frinier Design Studio with his wife and creative partner, Catherine Frinier, to further expand their work in the furniture and textile design industries.

Career and design
Former Chief Creative Officer of the Brown Jordan Company for over 20 years, Frinier >, Frinier
formed a design consultancy in California along with his wife and creative partner, Catherine Frinier, where they have continued to serve and collaborate with an international clientele through licensed and co-branded collections, including indoor/outdoor furniture, accessories, lighting, and hundreds of textile designs.

References

1946 births
Living people
American designers